René Mandrillon (28 August 1928 in Lamoura, Jura, France – 3 March 1970 in Lamoura) was a French cross-country skier who competed in the 1950s. He was born in Lamoura. He finished 18th in the 18 km event at the 1952 Winter Olympics in Oslo.

References

External links
18 km Olympic cross country results: 1948-52

1928 births
1970 deaths
Olympic cross-country skiers of France
Cross-country skiers at the 1952 Winter Olympics
Cross-country skiers at the 1956 Winter Olympics
Cross-country skiers at the 1960 Winter Olympics
French male cross-country skiers
Sportspeople from Jura (department)
20th-century French people